Hatton railway station may refer to:
 Hatton railway station (Aberdeenshire), in Scotland
 Hatton railway station (Tayside), a closed railway station in Scotland
 Hatton railway station (Sri Lanka)
 Hatton railway station (England), in Hatton, Warwickshire

See also
 Tutbury and Hatton railway station in Staffordshire